Gargela minuta is a moth in the family Crambidae. It was described by Shi-Mei Song, Fu-Qiang Chen and Chun-Sheng Wu in 2009. It is found in Taiwan.

References

Crambinae
Moths described in 2009
Moths of Taiwan